Guipavas is a commune in the Finistère department of Brittany in north-western France. The writer Maurice Polard (born 1932) is from Guipavas.

The city is divided into two major parts: the west, known as the dynamic core of the city and suburban area of Brest, where a new commercial centre opened in 2007, and the east, which is more traditional and lies around the Roman Catholic church.

Population
Inhabitants of Guipavas are called in French Guipavasiens.

Breton language
In 2008, 4.39% of primary-school children attended bilingual schools, where Breton language is taught alongside French.

See also
 Brest Bretagne Airport
Communes of the Finistère department
Yann Larhantec
List of the works of Bastien and Henry Prigent

References

External links
Official website 

Mayors of Finistère Association 

Communes of Finistère